The Mummy is an action adventure horror film media franchise based on films by Universal Pictures about a mummified ancient Egyptian priest who is accidentally resurrected, bringing with him a powerful curse, and the ensuing efforts of heroic archaeologists to stop him. The franchise was created by Nina Wilcox Putnam and Richard Schayer.

Universal

Original series (1932–1955)

The original series of films consisted of six installments, which starred iconic horror actors such as Boris Karloff (only in the original one, as Imhotep); Tom Tyler and Lon Chaney Jr. as Kharis; and lastly Eddie Parker, who played Klaris, a cousin of Kharis. The series of films is part of the larger Universal Classic Monsters series.

The Mummy (1932)

When archaeologists awaken the tomb of the mummy Imhotep, he sets out to find the reincarnation of his long-lost love.

The Mummy's Hand (1940)

Steve Banning and his assistant Babe Jenson, who are being watched by spies, decide to fund an expedition. A magician and his beautiful daughter join the expedition, but when they awaken the tomb of the mummy Kharis, they don’t know whether they’re going to survive the expedition.

The Mummy's Tomb (1942)

The mummy Kharis is back after he was lit on fire 30 years ago. After 30 years, Steve Banning has now become a famous archaeologist and is living in the peaceful town of Mapleton, Massachusetts. However the town becomes less peaceful when Steve is murdered by an unknown assailant. His son John tries to crack the case with some help from Babe Hanson, Steve’s friend who helped defeat Kharis 30 years ago.

The Mummy's Ghost (1944)

After Kharis is defeated by the Banning family, we go to a new character, Tom Harvey and his girlfriend Amina, who is the reincarnation of Princess Ananka, Kharis’s long-lost love who Kharis grows more closer to and wants to turn immortal, will Tom and the police put a stop to this?

The Mummy's Curse (1944)

25 years later after The Mummy's Ghost, an irrigation project in the bayous of Louisiana unearths The mummy Kharis from his sleep and he is resurrected once again, meanwhile Kharis's lost love, Ananka also forms from a swamp, causing the monster to embrace his 3,000 year old love after many years.

Abbott and Costello Meet the Mummy (1955)

Freddie Franklin and his best friend Peter Patterson just want to go back to the states, but get caught up in the mummy's tale when dr. Zoomer is murdered and they find a medallion, causing the police, a thief and her henchmen, a high priest and his henchmen and the mummy Klaris to go after them.

Stephen Sommers series (1999–2018)

Originally a proposed remake of The Mummy would have been directed by horror filmmaker/writer Clive Barker. Barker's vision for the film was violent, with the story revolving around the head of a contemporary art museum who turns out to be a cultist trying to reanimate mummies. Barker's take was "dark, sexual and filled with mysticism", and that, "it would have been a great low-budget movie".

In 1999, Stephen Sommers wrote and directed a remake of The Mummy, loosely based on the original film of 1932. This film switches genres from the emphasis on horror to action, concentrating more on adventure sequences, special effects, comedy, and a higher element of Egyptian lore. The film became a box office success spawning two sequels, several video games, a spin-off series, and an animated television series. The first two films received mixed to positive reviews, while the third one received mostly negative reviews.

The Mummy (1999)

It is the year 1923 and Rick O'Connell, an American explorer, has discovered Hamunaptra, the city of the dead. Three years later, he meets with a beautiful librarian, Evelyn "Evy" Carnahan and her brother, Jonathan. When Evy accidentally revives the mummified corpse of an Egyptian priest, Imhotep, the pair must find a way to kill him before he rises back into power and destroys the world.

The Mummy Returns (2001)

In 1933, Rick O'Connell and Evelyn Carnahan are married with an 8-year-old son, Alex. When Alex triggers a curse and Imhotep is resurrected, Rick and Evy must once again try to save the world and fight both the mummy and the Scorpion King.

The Mummy: Tomb of the Dragon Emperor (2008)

Set in 1946, the film continues the adventures of Rick O'Connell, his wife Evy, and his son Alex against a different mummy, the Dragon Emperor (Jet Li) of China.

Cancelled fourth film
After Tomb of the Dragon Emperor was released, actress Maria Bello stated that another Mummy film will "absolutely" be made, and that she had already signed on. Actor Luke Ford was signed on for three films as well. In 2012, Universal Pictures cancelled the film and later developed a reboot of the series.

The Scorpion King spin-off series (2002–2018)

This spin-off series follows the adventures of Mathayus of Akkad, who would later be known as the Scorpion King and, eventually, become a foe in The Mummy Returns. The films are as follows:

The Scorpion King (2002)
 
A 2002 film.

The Scorpion King 2: Rise of a Warrior (2008)
  
A 2008 prequel (direct-to-video) film.

The Scorpion King 3: Battle for Redemption (2012)
  
A 2012 sequel (direct-to-video) film.

The Scorpion King 4: Quest for Power (2015)
   
A 2015 sequel (direct-to-video) film.

The Scorpion King: Book of Souls (2018)
   
A 2018 sequel (direct-to-video) film.

Critical and public response

Dark Universe

The Mummy (2017)

In 2012, Universal Studios announced a reboot of the series with writer Jon Spaihts, and with Sean Daniel returning as producer. Universal also signed a two-year deal to produce the film with K/O Paper Products. Len Wiseman was hired to direct the film. The Hunger Games' writer Billy Ray was hired to write a competing draft against Spaihts written script. Wiseman later left the film project the following year due to schedule conflicts. Mama'''s director Andrés Muschietti was in talks to direct the film.

The screenwriter Roberto Orci hinted at the time that both The Mummy and Van Helsing reboots would have a shared universe. Universal set the film to release on April 22, 2016. Director Muschetti left the film due to creative differences. Universal tapped Alex Kurtzman and Chris Morgan in 2014 to develop all classic movie monsters which include Frankenstein, Dracula, The Wolf Man, Creature from the Black Lagoon, The Invisible Man, Bride of Frankenstein, and The Mummy. The first film they developed together was The Mummy, for which they had begun the meetings. Kurtzman was later set to direct the film. The film's release date was pushed back to March 27, 2017, when Universal announced the April 22 for its new film The Huntsman. The film's plot is set in Iraq and follows a Navy SEAL and his team that battle mummies led by Ashurbanipal.

Kurtzman and Spaihts had two scripts with a male and a female mummy villain. Tom Cruise was in talks to star in the film, while Sofia Boutella was in talks for the female Mummy role in the reboot. Both were ultimately confirmed to star in the reboot with a June 9, 2017, release date. Annabelle Wallis and Jake Johnson were in talks for a role of an archaeologist and a member of the military respectively. The film began production on April 3, 2016 in Oxford, England.

The film became a critical and commercial failure, causing all the future planned films in the Dark Universe to be cancelled.

Feature films

Cast and crew
Cast

Crew

Other media
Video games
Two video game adaptations of The Mummy (1999) were developed by Rebellion Developments and published by Konami in 2000: an action adventure game for the PlayStation and PC as well as a Game Boy Color puzzle game. Dreamcast version was announced but later cancelled in the late 2000. The Mummy Returns was released in late 2001 for the PlayStation 2 and developed by Blitz Games and the Game Boy Color version was developed by GameBrains; both versions were published by Universal Interactive. The Mummy: Tomb of the Dragon Emperor was released in 2008, developed by Eurocom for the PlayStation 2 and the Wii, the Nintendo DS released was developed by A2M, all versions were published by Sierra Entertainment. In March 2012, a massive multiplayer online game known as The Mummy Online was released. In 2017 was released The Mummy Demastered based on the film of the same year.

Comic books
In May 2001, Chaos! Comics released the first of a three-issue series inspired by the film, titled The Mummy: Valley of the Gods. The plot was supposed to take place between the first film and The Mummy Returns. Rick and Evelyn are on their honeymoon in Egypt and end up embarking on yet another adventure where they must unravel the mysteries of the Orb of Destiny and discover the location of the Valley of the Gods hidden beneath the sands. However, the second and third issues were never published.
This was most likely due to Chaos later filing bankruptcy in 2002 and selling the rights to all their titles at that time.
Years later in 2008, another Mummy comic series was released by IDW Publishing, spanning four issues. This series was titled The Mummy: The Rise and Fall of Xango's Ax. Unlike the preceding comic series, all of the planned issues were published.

Television
From 2001 until 2003, an animated series simply titled The Mummy was made by Universal Animation Studios where it was based on the Stephen Sommers series of films. The series was later renamed in the second season as The Mummy: Secrets of the Medjai.

Theme park rides
The film also inspired a roller coaster ride named Revenge of the Mummy in Universal Studios Theme Parks, Florida. Similar rides can also be found in Hollywood and Singapore.

 Hammer series (1959–1971) 
In 1959, the franchise was rebooted, starring Peter Cushing and Christopher Lee.  Though the title suggests Universal Pictures' 1932 film of the same title, the film actually derives its plot and characters entirely from two 1940s Universal films, The Mummy's Hand and The Mummy's Tomb, with the climax borrowed directly from The Mummy's Ghost''. The character name Joseph Whemple, the use of a sacred scroll, and a few minor plot elements are the only connections with the 1932 version.

The Mummy (1959) 

After archaeologists unearth the tomb of the mummy Kharis, 3 years later he gets revenge and the body count rises, but the wife of one of the archaeologists resembles princess Ananka, his long-lost love, causing Kharis to abduct her to an unknown fate.

The Curse of the Mummy's Tomb (1964) 

Another group of archaeologists unearth the mummy of Prince Ra,  who has to get revenge on the same archaeologists and soon the body count rises again, with some unexpected twists and turns.

The Mummy's Shroud (1967) 

Another group of archaeologists unearth the tomb, this time of Prince Kah-To-Bey who was buried as a child and soon there is betrayal, greed, stealing, insanity and murder, all into the mix were the archaeologists get violent deaths and some very shady characters appear to do something deceiving.

Blood from the Mummy's Tomb (1971) 

Queen Tera one night is killed by some high priests, who are also killed because of her magical power. Then some archaeologists unearth her tomb but find nothing except her ring. At the same time young Margaret is born and then a few years later she looks exactly like the queen and soon the power of queen Tera overcomes her to the point where she has Tera's powers and kills people with it. Her father attempts to stop this carnage.

See also 
 Universal Classic Monsters
 Dracula (Universal film series)
 Frankenstein (Universal film series)
 The Invisible Man (film series)
 The Wolf Man (franchise)

References

Film series introduced in 1932
Adventure film series
Fantasy film franchises
Horror film franchises
Universal Pictures franchises
Horror mass media franchises
 
Universal Monsters film series
Resurrection in film
Action film franchises
Mummy films
Films set in deserts
English-language films